Hvannasund (older spelling: Quannesund) is a village and municipality in the Faroe Islands, an autonomous region in Denmark.

Hvannasund is located on the west coast of the island of Viðoy. It faces Norðdepil on Borðoy. The villages are connected to each other by a causeway. A large cracked rock rests in an area just north of Hvannasund. An old legend details that the rock, called Skrudhettan, broke the very moment that Jesus was born. 

On 26 May 2008, the ocean inexplicably receded 2½ – 3 metres before suddenly hitting the area with great strength. A couple of days later, it was reported that a mini-tsunami had hit Hvannasund. There were no injuries or fatalities.

On 3 September 2008, a majority of the town council, notably excluding the mayor, announced that there would be a referendum on merging Hvannasund municipality with the municipality of Klaksvík. The referendum was held on 17 September. Of the 321 eligible, 278 cast their votes. The result was 68 in favor, 208 against and 2 blanks, thus the merger was rejected.

Towns in municipality 
 Hvannasund
 Norðdepil
 Depil
 Norðtoftir
 Fossá (abandoned)
 Múli

Culture

Church 
The church in Hvannasund was built in 1949 and was built by locals. Efforts to get contractors to build the church were unsuccessful, and the church ended up being built by local residents. On 13 November 1949, the church was consecrated by provost Jákup Joensen, which was his very first consecration of a church building. The church was designed by Faroese architect H.C.W. Tórgarð and has room for roughly 100 people. It is located close to the sea in very picturesque environment.

In 2016 an additional building was built next to the church to be used for events that require space for more people, such as funerals, weddings and baptisms.

Notable residents 

 Livar Nysted

See also 
 List of towns in the Faroe Islands

References

External links 

Faroeislands.dk: Hvannasund Images and description of all cities on the Faroe Islands.

Populated places in the Faroe Islands
Municipalities of the Faroe Islands